Two ships have been named USS Johnston in the United States Navy in honor of John Vincent Johnston.

, was a  launched 10 October 1945 and transferred to Taiwan in 1980

See also

United States Navy ship names